The Anglophone problem, as it is commonly referred to in Cameroon, is a socio-political issue rooted in Cameroon's colonial legacies from the Germans, British, and the French.

The issue classically and principally opposes many Cameroonians from the Northwest and Southwest regions, many of whom consider themselves Anglophones, to the Cameroonian government. This is based on the fact that these two regions (formally British Southern Cameroons) were controlled by Britain as a mandated and trust territory of the League of Nations and the United Nations respectively.

Background 

While many Northwesterners and Southwesterners believe there is an Anglophone problem, some do not. In fact, the term "Anglophone" today creates a lot of controversy, as many former French-speaking Cameroonians who are either multilingual or speak only English (most of whom have gone through the English sub-system of education) consider themselves Anglophones. The root of the Anglophone problem in Cameroon can be traced back to the Foumban Conference of 1961 which united the two territories, with different colonial legacies, into one state. The Anglophone problem is increasingly dominating the political agenda of Cameroon. This problem has led to arguments and actions (protests, strikes, etc.) that argue for federalism or separation from the union by the Anglophones. Failure to address the Anglophone problem threatens Cameroon's ability to create national unity between the two groups of people.

Origins

European colonization 
The roots of the Anglophone problem can be traced back to World War I, when Cameroon was known as German Kamerun. Germans first gained influence in Cameroon in 1845 when Alfred Saker of the Baptist Missionary Society introduced a mission station. In 1860, German merchants established a factory: the Woermann Company. On 5 July 1884 local tribes provided the Woermann Company with rights to control the Kamerun River, consequently setting the foundation for the later German colonization of Kamerun. (What was called the Kamerun River is now the delta of what is called the Wouri River.) In 1916, during World War I, France and Britain joined forces to conquer the colony. Later, the Treaty of Versailles would award France and Britain mandates over Cameroon as punishment of the Germans who lost the war. Each colonizer would later influence the colonies with their European languages and cultures, thus rendering them as Anglophones and Francophones. The large difference in awarded territory has resulted in present-day Cameroon having a huge majority Francophone population and a very small minority Anglophone population.

Gaining independence 
Following World War II, a wave of independence flowed rapidly throughout Africa. The United Nations obliged that Britain and France relinquish their colonies and guide them towards independence. There were three political options for British Southern Cameroons. They could become independent by uniting with Nigeria or with French Cameroun. No option of self-determination by becoming independent was given. The most desired option was independence with the least popular being unification with French Cameroun. However, during the British Plebiscite of 1961, the British argued that Southern Cameroons was not economically viable enough to sustain itself as an independent nation and could only survive by joining with Nigeria or La République du Cameroun (the Republic of Cameroon). Though documents on the United Nations' "Non-Self-Governing Territories" state, "integration should be the result of the freely expressed wishes of the territory's peoples", the United Nations would later reject Southern Cameroons' appeal to have independence as a sovereign nation placed on the ballot. The plebiscite questions were:  
 Do you wish to achieve independence by joining the independent Federation of Nigeria?
  Do you wish to achieve independence by joining the independent Republic of Cameroun?
The United Nations documents defined the basis of integration as: "Integration with an independent State should be on the basis of complete equality between the peoples of the erstwhile Non-Self-Governing Territory and those of the independent country with which it is integrated. The peoples of both territories should have equal status and rights of citizenship... at all levels in the executive, legislative and judicial organs of government." With this promise in mind, in February 1961, British Northern Cameroons voted to join Nigeria, while British Southern Cameroons voted to join La République du Cameroun.

The Foumban Conference of 17–21 July 1961 
The purpose of the Foumban Constitutional Conference was to create a constitution for the new Federal state of British Southern Cameroon and La République du Cameroun. The conference brought together representatives from La République du Cameroun, including Amadou Ahidjo, their president, with representatives from Southern Cameroons. Two weeks before the Foumban Conference, there were reports that more than one hundred people were killed by terrorists in Loum, Bafang, Ndom, and Douala. The reports worried unification advocates who wanted British Cameroon to unify with French Cameroun. For the conference, the location of Foumban had been carefully chosen to make Ahidjo appear as if he had everything under control. Mr. Mbile, a Southern Cameroonian representative at the conference noted, "Free from all the unrest that had scared Southern Cameroonians, the Francophone authorities had picked the place deliberately for the occasion. The entire town had been exquisitely cleaned up and houses splashed with whitewash. Food was good and receptions lavish. The climate in Foumban real or artificial went far to convince us that despite the stories of 'murder and fire,' there could be at least this island of peace, east of the Mungo."

Before the Foumban Conference, all the parties in Southern Cameroons, the Native Authority Councils and the traditional leaders attended the Bamenda Conference. This conference decided on a common proposal to present when negotiations with La République du Cameroun arrived. Among many things, the Bamenda Conference agreed on a non-centralized federation to ensure there was a distinction between the powers of the states and the powers of the federation. Most of the proposals from the Bamenda Conference were ignored by Ahidjo. Some of these proposals included having a bicameral legislature and decentralizing power, but instead a unicameral system was established with a centralized system of power.

At the Foumban conference, Ahidjo presented delegates with a draft constitution. By the end of the conference, instead of creating an entirely new constitution, the contributions of the Southern Cameroons delegates were reflected in suggestions made to the draft initially presented to them. John Ngu Foncha and Ahidjo intended for the Foumban Constitutional Conference to be brief; however, delegates left the three-day conference with the impression that there would be sequential conferences to continue the drafting of the constitution. Mbile later noted, "We may have done more if we had spent five months instead of five days in writing our constitution at Foumban." The Constitution for the new Federal Republic was agreed in Yaoundé in August 1961, between Ahidjo and Foncha, pending approval by the House of Assembly of the two states. In the end, the West Cameroon House of Assembly never ratified the Constitution. However, on 1 October 1961, the Federal Republic of Cameroon nevertheless came to fruition.

On 6 May 1972 Ahidjo announced his decision to convert the Federal Republic into a unitary state, on the provision that the idea was supported via referendum. This suggestion violated the articles in the Foumban document that read: 'any proposal for the revision of the present constitution, which impairs the unity and integrity of the Federation shall be inadmissible,' and 'proposals for revision shall be adopted by simple majority vote of the members of the Federal Assembly, provided that such majority includes a majority of the representatives ... of each of the Federated States,' not through referendum. Such violations easily allowed for the passing of the referendum that turned the Federal Republic into the United Republic of Cameroon. Taking into account these actions, the evidence shows that the Francophone's intentions may have not been to form a federal state, but rather to annex Southern Cameroons and not treat them as equals. In 1984, Ahidjo's successor, Paul Biya, replaced the name "United Republic of Cameroon" with "La République du Cameroun," the same name the francophone Cameroon had before federation talks. With changes in the Constitution of 1996, reference to the existence of a territory called the British Southern Cameroons that had a "functioning self-government and recognized international boundaries" was essentially erased.

The Anglophone problem 
Despite the non-acknowledgement/denial of the Anglophone problem from Francophone government leaders, there exists a discontent by Anglophones, both young and old, as to how Anglophones are treated. This discontent presents itself in calls for federation or separation with movements that are garnering strength. At the core of Anglophone grievances is the loss of the former West Cameroon as a "distinct community defined by differences in official language and inherited colonial traditions of education, law, and public administration." On 22 December 2016, in a letter to Paul Biya, the Anglophone Archbishops of Southern Cameroons define the Anglophone problem as follows:
 The failure of successive governments of Cameroon, since 1961, to respect and implement the articles of the Constitution that uphold and safeguard what British Southern Cameroons brought along to the Union in 1961.
 The flagrant disregard for the Constitution, demonstrated by the dissolution of political parties and the formation of one political party in 1966, the sacking of Jua and the appointment of Muna in 1968 as the Prime Minister of West Cameroon, and other such acts judged by West Cameroonians to be unconstitutional and undemocratic.
 The cavalier management of the 1972 Referendum which took out the foundational element (Federalism) of the 1961 Constitution.
 The 1984 Law amending the Constitution, which gave the country the original East Cameroon name (The Republic of Cameroon) and thereby erased the identity of the West Cameroonians from the original union. West Cameroon, which had entered the union as an equal partner, effectively ceased to exist.
 The deliberate and systematic erosion of the West Cameroon cultural identity which the 1961 Constitution sought to preserve and protect by providing for a bi-cultural federation.

Separation 
Movements that advocate the separation of English-speaking Cameroon from French-speaking Cameroun exist, led by the Cameroon Action Group, the Southern Cameroons Youth League, the Southern Cameroons National Council, the Southern Cameroon Peoples Organization and the Ambazonia Movement.

Federation 
Advocates of Federation want a return to the constitution agreed upon in the 1961 Foumban Conference that acknowledges the history and culture of the two regions while giving equal power to the two. This federation had been dismantled on 20 May 1972 by the larger French-speaking Cameroon and extended the latter's executive power throughout West Cameroon. Federation advocates include the instrumental Consortium of the leaders of three Cameroon-based trade unions: Lawyers, Teachers, and Transporters. It also includes some Cameroonians in the diaspora led by a well-organized US-based Anglophone Action Group, Inc. (AAG). AAG was one of the first groups in the diaspora to endorse the Cameroon-based Consortium as a peaceful alternative to achieving a return to the pre-1972 federated system. Opponents of federation include the ruling Cameroon Peoples Democratic Movement.

Unitary 
Unitarianism do not want Federation or Separation, but rather a decentralized unitary government; whereas, now the government is highly centralized in power. This violates the tenets of the 1996 Constitution as decentralization has yet to be implemented.

Struggle for political representation 
In March 1990, the Social Democratic Front (SDF), led by John Fru Ndi, was founded on the perception of widespread Anglophone alienation. The SDF was the first major opposition party to the People's Democratic Movement, led by Paul Biya.

Symptoms of Anglophone discontent 
Below are various reasons that Anglophones feel marginalized, systemically, by the government.
 The National Entrance Examinations into Schools that develop the human resources of Cameroon are set by the French Subsystem of Education. This makes it difficult for Anglophones and Francophones to compete on an equal playing field. The Examination Board members are all Francophone, which places some bias against Anglophone candidates.
 There are five Ministries that concern education and none of them are Anglophone.
 Of the 36 Ministers who defended the budgets for the Ministries last month, only one was Anglophone.
 In the 1961 Constitution, the Vice President was the second most important person in state protocol. Today, the Prime Minister (appointed Anglophone) is the fourth most important person in State Protocol, after the President of the Senate and the President of the National Assembly.

Prioritization of French over English 
 State institutions put documents and public notices in French, with no English translations.
 National Entrance Examinations into some professional schools are set in French only, sometimes even in English-speaking regions.
 Most of the heads of government offices speak only French, even in the English-speaking regions. Visitors and clients to government offices are then expected to speak in French.
 Most Senior Administrators and members of the Forces of Law and Order in the Northwest and Southwest Regions are French-speaking and there is a lack of effort for them to demonstrate an understanding of Anglophone culture.
 Members of Inspection Teams, Missions and Facilitators for Seminars sent from the Ministries in Yaoundé to Southern Cameroon are mostly French speaking, and English-speaking audiences are expected to understand them.
 Most of the Military Tribunals in the Northwest and Southwest Regions conduct their courts in French.
 Finance documents such as the COBAC Code, the CIMA Code and the OHADA Code are all in French.
 The Magistrates in the Southern Cameroon regions are disproportionately Francophone. In addition, other government-appointed officials such as the Senior Divisional Officers, the Divisional Officers, Commissioners, and Commandants are disproportionately Francophone. There are Francophone principals in Anglophone schools, and Hospitals, Banks and Mobile Telephone Companies are predominantly Francophone.

Spiraling 
, the Anglophone problem is still on-going. It has spiralled into violence with police officers and gendarmes shooting dead several civilians. Official sources have put the number at 17 dead, but local individuals and groups have talked of 50 or more. Radical members of some secessionist groups have killed several police officers and gendarmes. 15,000 refugees have fled Southern Cameroons into neighbouring Nigeria, with the UNHCR expecting that number to grow to 40,000 if the situation continues.

Outcomes 
Without clearly acknowledging the existence of the Anglophone problem, the President of Cameroon has attempted to appease tensions by making a number of announcements:
 President Biya ordered the creation of a Common Law department at the Supreme Court and the School of Administration and Magistracy, ENAM.
 In his 2017 traditional end-of-year address, he announced there will be an effective decentralization scheme implemented by the government. The issue of decentralization is one of the major tenets of Cameroon's 1996 constitution which was spearheaded by the Anglophone opposition groups in parliament.
Several separatist or secessionist groups have emerged or become more prominent as a result of the harsh response by the government to the Anglophone problem. These groups desire to see Southern Cameroons completely separate from La République du Cameroun and form its own state, sometimes referred to as Ambazonia. Some groups such as the Southern Cameroons Ambazonia Consortium United Front (SCACUF) used diplomatic means in an attempt to gain independence for the Anglophone regions, whereas other groups began to employ armed confrontation with artisan weapons against the deployed gendarmes and soldiers in those regions.

See also
 2016–2017 Cameroonian protests
 Ambazonia
 Anglophone Cameroonian
 Cameroonian English
 Camfranglais
 Anglophone Crisis

References

English language
Human rights in Cameroon
Language policy in Cameroon
Languages of Cameroon
Linguistic controversies
Linguistic rights
Majority–minority relations
Politics of Ambazonia